(Japanese Festival) is a Japanese cultural festival held in Bandung, West Java, Indonesia. This is a big Japanese event organized by Telkom Institute of Technology’s. Nihon no Matsuri has been held every year since 2007. It contains different activities every year, but the main activities are the Band Auditions, the Cosplay Contest, the Culture and Self-Defense Show, Charity events, and Japanese Language training for high school students.
Nihon no Matsuri has become one of the most awaited event for all japan-lovers in Bandung.

Events List

Gallery

References

Cultural festivals in Indonesia